Mohanna may refer to:
 Mohanna, Andika
 Mohanna, Khorramshahr
 Mohanna, Ramhormoz